The helicon is a brass musical instrument in the tuba family. Most are B basses, but they also commonly exist in E, F, and tenor sizes, as well as other types to a lesser extent.

The sousaphone is a specialized version of the helicon. The first sousaphone, a non-production prototype made by J. W. Pepper & Son, Inc., had an upright bell, hence the nickname "rain catcher" because of its shape. Both the sousaphone and helicon have a wide and roughly-circular shape leaving a large empty area in the center, and are designed to be worn around the player's body, with the inside of the coil resting on the shoulder.

The instrument is very popular in Central and Eastern Europe and is a common instrument for a military band and a mounted band. It is used by Ed Neuhauser of the traditional folk band Bellowhead.

The range of the B helicon is two octaves below that of a B cornet, thus similar to the more common B bass tuba (though generally without the additional valves and other optional features sometimes seen on tubas, meaning that a few notes in the lowest range are unavailable on the helicon).

History 
The helicon is derived from the saxhorn, or the saxtuba. Helicons were first used in the 1860s in cavalry and artillery mounted bands, then later used in military marching bands.

Helicon family 
The Slovenian composer Igor Krivokapič invented a new family of Helicons which were produced by the German manufacturer Melton:

 Soprano in E
 Alto in B
 Tenor in E
 Baritone in B
 Bass in F (or EE)
 Contrabass in BB (or CC)

References 

Brass instruments